Valentin Dmitrievich Berestov (April 1, 1928 in Meshchovsk, Kaluga Oblast — April 15, 1998 in Moscow) was a Russian poet, lyricist, who wrote for both adults and children, translator, memoirist, Pushkin scholar, researcher.

Biography 
Valentin Berestov was born on April 1, 1928 in Meshchovsk, Kaluga Oblast. Read the future poet learned in four years. In 1942, during World War II, Berestov’s family was evacuated to Tashkent. There, he was lucky to get acquainted with Nadezhda Mandelstam, who introduced him to Anna Akhmatova. Then there was a meeting with Korney Chukovsky, who played a big role in the fate of Valentin Berestov.

His first works were published in the Smena Magazine in 1946. The first collection of poetry 'Departure' and the first children's book for the About the car came out in 1957. Then the readers were acquainted with the collection of poems and tales of Happy Summer, Pictures in puddles, Smile and others.

He was a member of the Union of Soviet Writers. He signed the letter in defense of Yuli Daniel and Andrei Sinyavsky (1966).

In his later years, he wrote and produced children's stories with his wife, artist, and writer Tatyana Alexandrova.

Valentin Berestov is buried at Khovanskoye Cemetery.

References

External links 
 Забытый мудрец и кудесник Валентин Берестов
 Детские стихи Валентина Берестова на Знайка.нет

1928 births
1998 deaths
People from Meshchovsk
People from Meshchovsky District
20th-century Russian poets
Soviet poets
Russian male poets
Soviet male writers
20th-century Russian male writers
Russian-language poets
Children's poets
Moscow State University alumni
20th-century Russian translators